The New York City Subway system has  lettered or numbered route designations.

 The  train normally operates local, but during rush hours it is joined by the  train in the peak direction. Both run local, express or skip-stop on different parts of their route.
 The  has portions of express and local service, but during rush hours, an express variant of the route, designated by a diamond-shaped route marker, is operated alongside the local in Brooklyn in the peak direction.
 The letter  is used for three shuttle services: the Rockaway Park Shuttle, Franklin Avenue Shuttle, and 42nd Street Shuttle.

The subway normally operates 24 hours a day with five different service patterns: rush-hour, midday, evening, weekend and late-night. Each service has a table in its article to show what tracks are used and when. This article lists all the current services, along with their lines and terminals and a brief description; see Unused New York City Subway service labels for unused and defunct services.

In the New York City Subway nomenclature, numbered or lettered "services" use different segments of physical trackage, or "lines". The services that run on certain lines change periodically.

Time periods 

The New York City Subway is one of the few subways worldwide operating 7 days a week, 24 hours a day, every day of the year. The schedule is divided into different periods, with each containing different operation patterns and train intervals.

The MTA defines time periods as follows; these are used in articles (sometimes abbreviated by numbers in superscript or the symbol indicated):
  (1) rush hours – 6:30 a.m. to 9:30 a.m. and 3:30 p.m. to 8:00 p.m., Monday–Friday
  (1a) rush hours in the peak direction (toward Manhattan in the morning, away from Manhattan in the afternoon)
 (2) middays – 9:30 a.m. to 3:30 p.m., Monday–Friday
 (2a) middays in the peak direction
 (2b) middays in the non-peak direction
  (3) evenings – 8:00 p.m. to 12:00 a.m., Monday–Friday
 (3a) early evenings – 8:00 p.m. to 9:30 p.m.
 (3b) evenings in the peak direction
 (3c) early evenings in the peak direction – 8:00 p.m. to 9:30 p.m.
  (4) weekends – 6:30 a.m. to 12:00 a.m., Saturday and Sunday
  (5) late nights – 12:00 a.m. to 6:30 a.m., every day
 (5a) weekday late nights
 (5b) weekend late nights

Other symbols are derivatives and are defined based on the rules above:

  all times – 24 hours a day, 7 days a week
  all times except rush hours in the peak direction
  all times except weekdays in the peak direction
  daily – criteria (1), (2), (3), and (4) above (all times except late nights)
  daily except rush hours in the peak direction
  daily – criteria (1), (2), (3), (4), and (5b) above (all times except weekday late nights)
  weekdays – criteria (1), (2), and (3) above
  nights and weekdays – criteria (1), (2), (3), and (5) above
  weekdays and weekday nights – criteria (1), (2), (3), and (5a) above
  nights and weekends – criteria (4) and (5) above
  weekends and weekend nights – criteria (4) and (5b) above
  limited service during rush hours – criterion (1) above, but only for selected trains
  limited service during rush hours in the peak direction
  service during rush hours in the reverse peak direction – opposite of criteria (1) above
  limited service during rush hours in the reverse peak direction

Service listing 
Lines with colors next to them are the primary trunk line of the corresponding service; they determine the color of the service bullets and diamonds, except shuttles, which are dark gray.

Current services

Future services

Service variants 

 The 6 service has a midday (2a) and rush hour (1a) diamond Bronx express service labeled <6>, in addition to 6 local service.
 The 7 service has a rush hour (1a), and evening (3c) diamond Queens express service labeled <7>, in addition to 7 local service.
 The F service has a rush hour (1a), diamond Brooklyn express service labeled <F>, in addition to F local service.

Several services operate shorter routes during lower ridership hours, but these are neither signed differently nor counted as separate services. Although service changes caused by General Orders for construction occur on most days during midday and overnight hours, and throughout most weekends, these changes are not counted as separate services.

Variants to a different terminal
Because of some terminal station capacity constraints, numerous services operate to a secondary terminal as well as their usual terminus during peak hours.

 Limited rush hour 2 trains operate to and from a different southern terminal.
 Limited rush hour 5 trains operate to and from two different northern terminals ( and ) and two different southern terminals ( and ).
 Limited rush hour E trains operate to and from a different northern terminal.
 Limited rush hour N trains operate from a different northern terminal.
Limited rush hour Q trains operate along different Brooklyn lines in the northbound direction (BMT Sea Beach and Fourth Avenue Lines).
 One rush hour R train operates to a different northern terminal.

Event variants

The following lines run in special service or after sporting and other events:

 The 7 train has a Manhattan-bound "Super Express" from Mets–Willets Point, operating express, and also bypassing Junction Boulevard, Hunters Point Avenue and Vernon Boulevard–Jackson Avenue after New York Mets games weeknights and weekends at Citi Field, as well as after US Open tennis matches.
 The Holiday Nostalgia Train, which is made up of retired subway cars, runs Sunday mornings and mid-days from Thanksgiving until the Sunday before Christmas. For the 2022 holiday season, the train, signed as the 1 train, travels via IRT trackage between 137th Street and Chambers Street.

Train frequency charts

Train intervals 
The schedule offers trains every 3 to 5 minutes on the most used sections during rush hours. During other traffic periods, intervals range usually from 4 to 12 minutes or up to 20 minutes on outer sections. During late nights, only selected express services are operated and all late-night services usually run every 20 minutes.

Trains per hour
This is a list of average train frequencies during different times of the day, measured in trains per hour (tph). This chart shows frequencies  based on the train intervals listed in timetables, with a margin of error of 2 tph.

History 

See New York City Subway nomenclature for a complete explanation; this is just a table of when each service has existed (and been signed for the public). Shuttles were SS until 1985, when they became  (which had been used for specials). See here for the colors used for shuttles in 1967; in 1968 all six became green, and in 1979 all shuttles became dark gray.

See also 

List of New York City Subway lines
New York City Subway nomenclature
Unused New York City Subway service labels
Staten Island Railway

References 

 

Subway services